Harold B. Franklin (4 May 1889 – 21 April 1941) was an American cinema chain executive who later moved into production of stage shows and films.
He co-produced the musical comedy Revenge with Music (1934). He produced the 1940 melodrama parody film The Villain Still Pursued Her.

Life

Harold B. Franklin was born in New York City, New York, on 4 April 1889.
He started his career as a vaudeville booking agent.
In 1914 he became a theater manager.

Cinema executive

Franklin joined Adolph Zukor's Famous Players-Lasky and became vice-president of Publix Theatres.
At the start of 1928 the Fox Film Corporation bought West Coast Theaters (Wesco), with over 232 houses. 
Franklin continued in charge of Wesco, based in Los Angeles.
Dynamite, directed by Cecil B. DeMille, premiered on 25 July 1929 at the Carthay Circle Theatre in Los Angeles. The next day Franklin wrote to DeMille asking him to cut almost forty minutes from the 129-minute film so that when it went into general release the smaller houses could get more daily screenings. DeMille said he would try, but the longer version is the one that has survived.
In 1930 Franklin lobbied against Daylight Saving, which he said cut 10% to 30% of gross theater sales. Industries involved in outdoor activities such as sports and barbecues were in favor of Daylight saving.

On 6 April 1930 Harley L. Clarke was elected president of Fox Films and Fox Theaters, replacing William Fox.
Clarke wanted more control over the Fox West Coast Theater chain, which Franklin had been running without much interference. After six months he offered Franklin a contract buy-out, which he accepted.
Franklin then became president of Hughes Franklin Theatres.
In 1932 RKO had a management shake-up driven by David Sarnoff, chairman of the board and president of RKO's parent, RCA.
Franklin became president of the theater division, Keith-Albee-Orpheum.
Franklin reorganized the division and eliminated twenty-eight unprofitable theaters, but gross revenues declined due to lack of good pictures and a general downturn in cinema attendance.
Franklin was transferred to become president of the RKO circuit.

Producer
In 1933 Franklin left RKO and joined up with Archibald Selwyn to form Frankwyn Productions, a stage production company.
He also became president of Standard Theatres.
Continental Varieties, a vaudeville review co-produced Selwyn and Franklin, opened at the Little Theatre on 3 October 1934 and ran for 77 performances. Yip Harburg wrote the lyrics.
Franklin's independent production company filmed Gambling in August–September 1934 at the ESSI studio in Astoria, Queens, directed by Rowland V. Lee. The picture was adapted from a 1929 stage melodrama written by George M. Cohan, in which he also starred.
Cohan was again the star of the film.
The film was a failure, described as "a stodgy adaptation of a definitely dated play directed in obsolete theatrical technique.

Franklin briefly worked for Columbia in 1935.
He managed the "Motion Pictures' Greatest Year" campaign in 1938.
In 1940 Franklin's independent film company Franklin-Blank released The Villain Still Pursued Her, which was distributed by RKO. 
The script by Elbert Franklin was based on the play The Fallen Saved.
The film is a parody of Victorian melodramas, described as "more silly than funny". Buster Keaton introduced some genuinely humorous moments. 
The film was a flop when it was released, but still has some fans.

Franklin died in Mexico City, Mexico, on 21 April 1941.

Work

Theater productions
Franklin is credited as producer of the following stage pieces:
Lady Jane (Play, Comedy)  Sep 10, 1934 - Oct 1934
Continental Varieties (Musical, Revue,)  Oct 03, 1934 - Nov 13, 1934
Conversation Piece (Play, Romantic Comedy)  Oct 23, 1934 - Dec 08, 1934
L'Aiglon (Play, Drama, Tragedy, Revival)  Nov 03, 1934 - Dec 1934
Revenge with Music (Musical)  Nov 28, 1934 - Apr 27, 1935

Films
Franklin is credited as producer in the following:
Gambling (1934) directed by Rowland V. Lee, starring George M. Cohan, Wynne Gibson, Dorothy Burgess 
The Villain Still Pursued Her (1940) directed by Edward F. Cline, starring Billy Gilbert, Anita Louise, Margaret Hamilton

Books
Franklin wrote two books:
'
'

References

Sources

1889 births
1941 deaths
American theatre managers and producers